The Arch of Tiberius was a triumphal arch built in 16 AD in the Forum Romanum to celebrate the recovery of the eagle standards that had been lost to Germanic tribes by Varus in 9 AD. The Roman general Germanicus had recovered the standards in 15 or 16 AD. 

The Arch spanned the Vicus Jugarius between the Temple of Saturn and the Basilica Julia. It was dedicated to the emperor Tiberius because in the Imperial period only the emperor could celebrate a Triumph, so the victory of Germanicus was celebrated as a triumph of Tiberius. Very little is known about this monument. It is mentioned in literary sources, and it is known from a relief on the Arch of Constantine. It appears to have been a single arch, like the later Arch of Titus, flanked by two columns of the Corinthian order. The foundations of the Arch have been found on the Forum, but nothing is visible.

See also
List of Roman triumphal arches
List of ancient monuments in Rome

References

External links 

Tiberius, Arch of
Tiberius